Saint-Brisson-sur-Loire (literally Saint-Brisson on Loire) is a commune in the Loiret department in north-central France.

Name
The name Saint-Brisson is traditionally derived that of Saint Brice, to whom the parish church is dedicated.

Château
The , built by the de Sancerre family in the early 13th century on the site of a 12th-century construction, is a tourist attraction, benefitting from its proximity to the many historic châteaux of the Loire Valley.

See also
Communes of the Loiret department

References

Saintbrissonsurloire